Kysorville is a hamlet and census-designated place (CDP) in the town of West Sparta, Livingston County, New York, United States. Its population was 110 as of the 2010 census.

Geography
Kysorville is in south-central Livingston County, along the northern edge of the town of West Sparta. New York State Route 36 passes through the community, and Interstate 390 forms the western edge. NY 36 leads northwest  to Mount Morris and southeast  to Dansville.

The community sits on the western side of the valley of Canaseraga Creek, a tributary of the Genesee River.

Demographics

References

Hamlets in Livingston County, New York
Hamlets in New York (state)
Census-designated places in Livingston County, New York
Census-designated places in New York (state)